Discrimination against autistic people is the discrimination and persecution that autistic people have been subjected to. Discrimination against autistic people is a form of ableism.

Prevalence
Research published in 2019 used data from more than 8,000 children in the University of London's Millennium Cohort Study, which tracks the lives of about 19,000 people born in the United Kingdom starting in 2000. Out of the children selected, 231 were autistic. The study from the Journal of Autism and Developmental Disorders found that these autistic children were more likely to engage in "two-way sibling bullying", meaning being both a victim and perpetrator of bullying.

Further research published in 2017, a meta-analysis of three studies, demonstrated that "first impressions of individuals with ASD made from thin slices of real-world social behavior by typically-developing observers are not only far less favorable across a range of trait judgments compared to controls, but also are associated with reduced intentions to pursue social interaction." The meta-analysis continues, "These patterns are remarkably robust, occur within seconds, do not change with increased exposure, and persist across both child and adult age groups." This may be why autistic people have "smaller social networks and fewer friendships, difficulty securing and retaining employment, high rates of loneliness, and an overall reduced quality of life." Smaller social networks, fewer friendships, and loneliness correlate with severe health outcomes. According to a paper published in the Journal of Health and Social Behavior, "Health risks associated with social isolation have been compared in magnitude to the well-known dangers of smoking cigarettes and obesity." Furthermore, according to the UK Office for National Statistics, the unemployment rate of autistic people may reach 85%, the highest rate among all disabled groups studied. Autistic adults are also more likely to face healthcare disparities, such as being unvaccinated against common diseases like tetanus and being more likely to use emergency services.

In the United States, people with disabilities are victims of violent crime three times as often as people without disabilities. The Bureau of Justice Statistics does not report separately on autistic victims, but it does note that the victimization rate is especially high among those whose disabilities are cognitive. A small-sample study of Americans and Canadians found that adults with autism face a greater risk of sexual victimization than their peers. Autistic respondents were more than twice as likely to say they had been the victim of rape and over three times as likely to report unwanted sexual contact. In 2018, a large scale study found that autistic girls were almost three times more likely to be a victim of sexual abuse.

Discrimination in media and culture
Representation of autistic people in media has perpetuated myths about autism, including characterizing autism as shameful and burdensome for family members, advertising the belief that there may be a cure for autism, and publicizing the long-disproven arguments surrounding vaccines and autism. These myths are perpetuated in mass media as well as news media and social media. Stigmatization of autism can also be perpetuated by advertising from autism conversion organizations, such as Autism Speaks' advertising wherein a mother describes feeling suicidal in front of her autistic daughter or the NYU Child Study Center's advertisements where autism is personified as a kidnapper holding children for ransom. The advertising from Autism Speaks also brings up another form of discrimination autistic children in particular face, which is subpar education. In the US, only one third of autistic children in public schools receive special education services.

Moreover, the autistic behavior known as stimming is frequently referred to as "distracting" and the way autistic people naturally talk is often described as rude.

Immigration
In the United States, the Trump administration supported restrictive immigration policies that discriminated against autistic people. Under these policies, autistic immigrants faced deportation.

In Canada, autistic immigrants have been denied citizenship or faced deportation due to being a perceived "burden" upon the Canadian medical system. In 2018, reforms were announced to Canadian immigration law to make it easier for autistic and disabled immigrants to migrate to Canada.

New Zealand effectively prohibits immigration of Autistic people.

See also
 Autism-friendly
 Autism rights movement
 Neurodiversity

References 

Sociological and cultural aspects of autism
aut
aut
aut
Ableism